The 1889–1890 pandemic, often referred to as the "Asiatic flu" or "Russian flu", was a worldwide respiratory viral pandemic. It was the last great pandemic of the 19th century, and is among the deadliest pandemics in history. The pandemic killed about 1 million people out of a world population of about 1.5 billion (0.067% of population). The most reported effects of the pandemic took place from October 1889 to December 1890, with recurrences in March to June 1891, November 1891 to June 1892, the northern winter of 1893–1894, and early 1895.

Although contemporaries described the pandemic as influenza and 20th-century scholars identified several influenza strains as the possible pathogen, some more recent authors suggest that it may have been caused by human coronavirus OC43.

Outbreak and spread

Modern transport infrastructure assisted the spread of the 1889 pandemic. The 19 largest European countries, including the Russian Empire, had about 200,000 km of railroads, and transatlantic travel by sea took less than six days (not significantly different from current travel time by air, given the timescale of the global spread of a pandemic). It was the first pandemic to spread not just through a region such as Eurasia, but worldwide.

It is conventionally believed that the disease was first reported in the Central Asian city of Bukhara in the Russian Empire (modern Uzbekistan) in May 1889. That goes back to publications of a local physician and follower of the miasma theory Oskar Heyfelder, who ignored the lack or catarrhal symptoms in the outbreak. Both a local independent commission of four doctors in August 1889 and historians in 2023 identified the infectious agent in Bukhara from May to August 1889 as not influenza, but malaria, which is endemic in the region, and the latter suggested anomalously cold and snowy winter and anomalously high ground water levels as possible reasons for the severeness of the outbeak.

It is also conventionally believed that newly-built Trans-Caspian railway enabled the disease to spread farther into Samarkand by August, and Tomsk, 3,200 km away, by October. However Russian military has not detected any flu in Samarkand in August, and despite significant military presence along the railway first flu cases were not diagnosed in the Turkestan Military District at all until late November.

Despite the Trans-Siberian Railway not yet been constructed (which is often cited as the reason for slow transmission of the virus to European Russia), the anomalous rise in flu cases was detected in the military in the second half of October from multiple European cities all the way to 108th meridian east.

By November it reached Saint Petersburg (infecting 180,000 of the city's under one million inhabitants) and Moscow. By mid-November Kiev was infected, and the next month the Lake Baikal region was as well, followed by the rest of Siberia and Sakhalin by the end of the year.

From St. Petersburg, the infection spread via the Baltic shipping trade to Vaxholm in early November 1889, and then to Stockholm and the rest of Sweden, infecting 60% of the population within eight weeks. Norway, and then Denmark, followed soon after. The German Empire first received it in Posen in December, and on 12 November 600 workers were reported sick in Berlin and Spandau, with the cases in the city reaching 150,000 within a few days, and ultimately half of its 1.5 million inhabitants. Vienna was infected around the same time. Rome was reached by 17 December. The flu also arrived in Paris in December, and towards the end of the month had spread to Grenoble, Toulon, Toulouse and Lyon on the mainland, and Ajaccio on Corsica. At this point Spain was also infected, killing up to 300 a day in Madrid. It reached London at the same time, from where it spread quickly within Great Britain and Ireland to Birmingham, Glasgow, Edinburgh, and Dublin.

The first case on American soil was reported on 18 December 1889. It then quickly spread throughout the East Coast and all the way to Chicago and Kansas in days. The first American death, Thomas Smith of Canton, Massachusetts, was reported on 25 December. San Francisco and other cities were also reached before the month was over, with the total US death toll at about 13,000. From there it spread to Mexico and to South America, reaching Buenos Aires by 2 February.

India received it in February 1890, and Singapore and the Dutch East Indies (now Indonesia) did by March. These were followed by Japan, Australia, and New Zealand by April, and then China in May; the infection continued to spread, reaching its original starting point in Central Asia.

Cases in Africa began to appear in port cities in late December 1889 and in January 1890, although there may have been an early outbreak in Durban, South Africa, in November 1889.  

In four months it had spread throughout the Northern Hemisphere. Deaths peaked in Saint Petersburg on 1 December 1889, and in the United States during the week of 12 January 1890. The median time between the first reported case and peak mortality was five weeks. In Malta, the Asiatic flu took hold between January 1889 and March 1890, with a fatality rate of 4% (39 deaths), and a resurgence in January to May 1892 with 66 fatalities (3.3% case fatality rate). When this flu began, it was debated whether it was in fact a human-to-human contagious disease; its virulence and rapid spread across all climates and terrains demonstrated that it was.

Responses

Medical treatment 
There was no standard treatment of flu; quinine and phenazone were used, as well as small doses of strychnine and larger ones of whisky and brandy, and as cheaper treatments linseed, salt and warm water, and glycerin. Many people also thought that fasting would 'starve' the fever, based on the belief that the body would not produce as much heat with less food; this was in fact poor medical advice. Furthermore, many doctors still believed in the miasma theory of disease rather than infectious spread; for example, notable professors of the University of Vienna, Hermann Nothnagel and Otto Kahler considered that the disease was not contagious.

Public health 
US public health departments did little prevention in advance, even though they knew through transoceanic telegraph cable reports, that the Russian influenza was on its way.

A result of the Asiatic flu in Malta is that influenza became for the first time a compulsorily notifiable illness.

Identification of virus responsible

Influenza virus 
Researchers have tried for many years to identify the subtypes of Influenza A responsible for the 1889–1890, 1898–1900 and 1918 epidemics. Initially, this work was primarily based on "seroarcheology"—the detection of antibodies to influenza infection in the sera of elderly people—and it was thought that the 1889–1890 pandemic was caused by Influenza A subtype H2, the 1898–1900 epidemic by subtype H3, and the 1918 pandemic by subtype H1. With the confirmation of H1N1 as the cause of the 1918 flu pandemic following identification of H1N1 antibodies in exhumed corpses, reanalysis of seroarcheological data suggested Influenza A subtype H3 (possibly the H3N8 subtype) as a more likely cause for the 1889–1890 pandemic.

Coronavirus 
After the 2002–2004 SARS outbreak, virologists started sequencing human and animal coronaviruses. A comparison of two virus strains in the Betacoronavirus 1 species bovine coronavirus and human coronavirus OC43 indicated that the two had a most recent common ancestor in the late 19th century, with several methods yielding most probable dates around 1890. The authors speculated that an introduction of the former strain to the human population, rather than influenza, might have caused the 1889 epidemic.

In 2020, two Danish bioinformatics researchers noted in an unpublished study that the clinical manifestations of the 1889 pandemic—runny nose, headache, high fever, severe chest inflammation, speeding up old respiratory diseases, and primarily killing elderly people—resembled COVID-19, a disease caused by a coronavirus, more than flu. Based on their calculations, they hypothesised that the human coronavirus OC43 had split from bovine coronavirus about 130 years prior, approximately coinciding with the pandemic of 1889–1890. Their calculation was based on genetic comparisons between bovine coronavirus and different strains of OC43. A Belgian team performed a similar analysis of OC43, identifying a crossover date in the late 1800s.

In 2021, examination of contemporary medical reports noted that the pandemic's clinical manifestations resembled those of COVID-19 rather than influenza, with notable similarities including multisystem disease, loss of taste and smell perception, central nervous system symptoms and sequelae similar to long COVID. Other scientists have pointed to the fact the mortality curve for Russian Flu is J-shaped, as found in COVID-19, with little mortality in the very young and high mortality in the old, rather than the U-shaped mortality found in influenza infections, with high mortality in the very young and very old.

While a small sample of dental remains has been tested and lends weight to the hypothesis, there is still no scientific consensus that the 1889–1890 outbreak was caused by a coronavirus, with one analysis of the literature suggesting that the evidence for this causality is still "conjectural".

Pathology

Patterns of mortality 
Unlike most influenza pandemics such as the 1918 flu, primarily elderly people died in 1889. Due to generally lower standards of living, worse hygiene, and poorer standard of medicine, the proportion of vulnerable people was higher than in the modern world.

Notable infections

Deaths

First outbreak

 1 January 1890 Henry R. Pierson
 7 January 1890 Augusta of Saxe-Weimar-Eisenach Dowager German Empress, Queen of Prussia
 14 January 1890 Ignaz von Döllinger
 15 January 1890 Walker Blaine
 18 January 1890 Amadeo I of Spain
 22 January 1890 Adam Forepaugh
 22 February 1890 Bill Blair
 12 March 1890 William Allen
 26 March 1890 Afrikan Spir
 23 May 1890 Louis Artan
 19 July 1890 James P. Walker
 14 August 1890 Michael J. McGivney

Recurrences

 23 January 1891 Prince Baudouin of Belgium
 10 February 1891 Sofya Kovalevskaya
 18 March 1891 William Herndon
 5 May 1891 William Connor Magee
 8 May 1891 Helena Blavatsky
 15 May 1891 Edwin Long
 3 June 1891 Oliver St John
 9 June 1891 Henry Gawen Sutton
 1 July 1891 Frederic Edward Manby
 20 December 1891 Grisell Baillie
 28 December 1891 William Arthur White
 7 January 1892 Tewfik Pasha
 8 January 1892 John Tay
 10 January 1892 John George Knight
 12 January 1892 Jean Louis Armand de Quatrefages de Bréau
 14 January 1892 Prince Albert Victor, Duke of Clarence and Avondale, grandson of Queen Victoria and second-in-line to the British throne
 17 January 1892 Charles A. Spring
 20 January 1892 Douglas Hamilton
 12 February 1892 Thomas Sterry Hunt
 15 April 1892 Amelia Edwards
 5 May 1892 Gustavus Cheyney Doane
 24 May 1892 Charles Arthur Broadwater
 10 June 1892 Charles Fenerty
 21 April 1893 Edward Stanley, 15th Earl of Derby
 2 July 1893 Georgie Drew Barrymore
 7 August 1893 Thomas Burges
 31 August 1893 William Cusins
 15 December 1893 Samuel Laycock
 16 December 1893 Tom Edwards-Moss
 3 January 1894 Hungerford Crewe, 3rd Baron Crewe
 24 January 1894 Constance Fenimore Woolson
 24 January 1894 Laura Schirmer Mapleson
 14 March 1894 John T. Ford
 19 June 1894 William Mycroft
 19 February 1895 John Hulke
 1 March 1895 Frederic Chapman
 2 March 1895 Berthe Morisot
 5 March 1895 Sir Henry Rawlinson, 1st Baronet
 20 March 1895 James Sime
 24 March 1895 John L. O'Sullivan
 2 August 1895 Joseph Thomson

Survivors 

 Alexander III of Russia
 Alfonso XIII of Spain
 John Thomas Banks
 Marie François Sadi Carnot
 Charles I of Württemberg
 Edward VII
 Empress Elisabeth of Austria
 Archduke Ernst of Austria
 William Ewart Gladstone
 Maurice de Hirsch
 Johanna von Puttkamer
 Karl Ludwig of Austria
 Pope Leo XIII
 Maria Feodorovna
 Archduchess Marie Valerie of Austria
 Olga Nikolaevna of Russia
 Oscar I of Sweden
 Pierre Tirard
 Robert Gascoyne-Cecil, 3rd Marquess of Salisbury
 Edward Villiers, 5th Earl of Clarendon

See also
 Carlill v Carbolic Smoke Ball Co – case in English contract law, concerning an advertisement of 1891 for a putative flu remedy
 Spanish flu
 Hong Kong flu
 2009 swine flu pandemic
 COVID-19 pandemic

Notes

References

Further reading
 
 
 
 

 
Influenza pandemics
1889 in biology
1890 in biology
1889 disease outbreaks
1890 disease outbreaks
19th-century epidemics
Epidemics in India